Statistics of the Scottish Football League in season 1992–93.

Scottish Premier Division

Scottish First Division

Scottish Second Division

See also
1992–93 in Scottish football

References

 
Scottish Football League seasons